Li Shenyuan (born 2 October 1997) is a Chinese footballer currently playing as a right-back for Shanghai Port.

Club career
Li Shenyuan would play for the Shanghai Port youth team before being sent to second tier football club Inner Mongolia Zhongyou on 29 July 2020 on loan. He would go on to make his professional debut on 13 September 2020 for Inner Mongolia Zhongyou in a league game against Beijing BSU in a 1-0 defeat. On his return to Shanghai Port he was immediately promoted to the senior team where he would make his debut on 26 November 2020 in the Chinese FA Cup against Changchun Yatai in a 4-0 defeat.

Career statistics
.

References

External links

1997 births
Living people
Chinese footballers
China youth international footballers
Association football midfielders
China League One players
Chinese Super League players
Shanghai Port F.C. players
Inner Mongolia Zhongyou F.C. players
21st-century Chinese people